In abstract algebra, a group isomorphism is a function between two groups that sets up a one-to-one correspondence between the elements of the groups in a way that respects the given group operations. If there exists an isomorphism between two groups, then the groups are called isomorphic. From the standpoint of group theory, isomorphic groups have the same properties and need not be distinguished.

Definition and notation

This is written

Often shorter and simpler notations can be used. When the relevant group operations are understood, they are omitted and one writes

Sometimes one can even simply write  Whether such a notation is possible without confusion or ambiguity depends on context. For example, the equals sign is not very suitable when the groups are both subgroups of the same group. See also the examples.

Conversely, given a group  a set  and a bijection  we can make  a group  by defining

If  and  then the bijection is an automorphism (q.v.).

Thus, the definition of an isomorphism is quite natural.

An isomorphism of groups may equivalently be defined as an invertible group homomorphism (the inverse function of a bijective group homomorphism is also a group homomorphism).

Examples 
In this section some notable examples of isomorphic groups are listed.
 The group of all real numbers under addition, is isomorphic to the group of positive real numbers under multiplication :
 via the isomorphism .

 If  is an infinite cyclic group, then  is isomorphic to the integers (with the addition operation). From an algebraic point of view, this means that the set of all integers (with the addition operation) is the "only" infinite cyclic group.

Some groups can be proven to be isomorphic, relying on the axiom of choice, but the proof does not indicate how to construct a concrete isomorphism. Examples:
 The group  is isomorphic to the group  of all complex numbers under addition.
 The group  of non-zero complex numbers with multiplication as the operation is isomorphic to the group  mentioned above.

Properties

The number of distinct groups (up to isomorphism) of order  is given by sequence A000001 in the OEIS. The first few numbers are 0, 1, 1, 1 and 2 meaning that 4 is the lowest order with more than one group.

Cyclic groups 
All cyclic groups of a given order are isomorphic to  where  denotes addition modulo 

We will show that

Define 
 so that  
Clearly,  is bijective. Then
 
which proves that

Consequences 

that it will map inverses to inverses,

and more generally, th powers to th powers,
 
and that the inverse map  is also a group isomorphism.

The relation "being isomorphic" satisfies is an equivalence relation.

Automorphisms 

An isomorphism from a group  to itself is called an automorphism of the group. Thus it is a bijection  such that

The image under an automorphism of a conjugacy class is always a conjugacy class (the same or another).

The composition of two automorphisms is again an automorphism, and with this operation the set of all automorphisms of a group  denoted by  forms itself a group, the automorphism group of 

For all abelian groups there is at least the automorphism that replaces the group elements by their inverses. However, in groups where all elements are equal to their inverses this is the trivial automorphism, e.g. in the Klein four-group.

In  for a prime number  one non-identity element can be replaced by any other, with corresponding changes in the other elements.

The automorphism group of  has order 168, as can be found as follows. All 7 non-identity elements play the same role, so we can choose which plays the role of  Any of the remaining 6 can be chosen to play the role of (0,1,0). This determines which element corresponds to  For  we can choose from 4, which determines the rest. Thus we have  automorphisms. They correspond to those of the Fano plane, of which the 7 points correspond to the 7  elements.

For abelian groups, all non-trivial automorphisms are outer automorphisms.

Non-abelian groups have a non-trivial inner automorphism group, and possibly also outer automorphisms.

See also 

 Group isomorphism problem

References 

 

Group theory
Morphisms